Del Loma (corruption of de la Loma, Spanish for "of the Hill") is an unincorporated community in Trinity County, California, United States.

History
Del Loma had a post office from 1928 to 1953

See also
Trinity County, California

References

Unincorporated communities in Trinity County, California
Unincorporated communities in California